Ronnie Liu Tian Khiew (Pha̍k-fa-sṳ: Liù Thiên-khiù) is a Malaysian politician. He has been the Member of Selangor State Legislative Assembly for Sungai Pelek since 2018. He was also the Member of Selangor EXCO for Local Government, Research and Development, and the Member of Selangor State Legislative Assembly for Pandamaran from 2008 to 2013.

Politics 
He was a Member of the DAP Central Executive Committee and the International Secretary for DAP. On 9 October 2022, he had announced that he will quit DAP due to dissatisfaction of some of the party leaders, but after two days he had decided to continue to stay in the party for his constituents.

Controversies

Chin Peng as a Fighter for Independence 
On 1 September 2005, in his blog in the official website of DAP, he had stated that Chin Peng, the leader of the Malayan Communist Party, is a Fighter of Independence for Malaya. This statement had offended many of the veteran soldiers, such as Kanang anak Langkau.

Obstructing operation of Subang Jaya City Council 
On 3 November 2007, police in Puchong had started an investigation on him as he had obstructed officers of the Subang Jaya City Council to stop immoral activities in a hotel in Bandar Puchong Jaya. Assistant Commissioner, Zainal Rashid Abu Bakar had said that he was given 5 warnings but he still refused to cooperate.

Tee Boon Hock Incident 
On 29 July 2010, The Star had exposed that Tee Boon Hock, a member of Klang Municipal Council had used official letters to enable his cronies and family members to get contracts from the government. On 12 August 2010, the Speaker of Selangor State Legislative Assembly, Teng Chang Khim and him were called to the DAP Disciplinary Committee as Tee had said that he was instructed by Ronnie.

Removing BERSATU from PH 
On 23 October 2019, he had criticised by-then Prime Minister of Malaysia, Mahathir Mohamed that he had a different ideology with Pakatan Harapan. He also asked for another general election so that Pakatan Harapan can form a better federal government without BERSATU. The members of BERSATU had denounced him and Mohd Rafiq Naizamohideen had asked DAP to reconsider the alliance between DAP and BERSATU. DAP had stated that this is just a personal statement by Ronnie and the Disciplinary Committee had summoned him for questioning.

Insulting the King 
On 21 October 2020, he had posted a picture of the 2020 Thai protest and captioned "They say no to the King". He deleted the post after someone had lodged a police report, but he still get investigated because of it.

Election results

References 

Democratic Action Party (Malaysia) politicians
Members of the Selangor State Legislative Assembly
Malaysian people of Chinese descent
Malaysian politicians of Chinese descent
Living people
Year of birth missing (living people)